Bala Taleqan District is in Taleqan County, Alborz province, Iran. At the latest census in 2016, the population of the district was 7,339 in 2,805 households. The largest village in the district is Dizan, with 665 inhabitants.

References 

Taleqan County

Districts of Alborz Province

Populated places in Alborz Province

Populated places in Taleqan County

fa:بخش بالاطالقان